Bruce Gordon may refer to:

 Bruce Gordon (musician) (born 1968), Canadian bassist and member of I Mother Earth
 Bruce L. Gordon (born 1963), American philosopher and Intelligent Design proponent
 Bruce S. Gordon (born 1946), American business executive and former NAACP president
 Bruce Gordon (actor/director), South African actor and director of 1919's The First Men in the Moon
 Bruce Gordon (American actor) (1916–2011), American character actor best known for playing Frank Nitti on The Untouchables
 Bruce Gordon (businessman) (born 1929), owner of Australian regional television broadcaster WIN Television
 Bruce Gordon (cricketer) (1878–1960), South African cricketer
 Bruce Gordon (historian), professor of ecclesiastical history
 Bruce Gordon (police officer), Canadian police officer
 Bruce Gordon, a fictional character and the current host of the DC Comics supervillain Eclipso

See also
 
 Gordie Bruce (1919–1997), ice hockey player